Thomas Gregor Brodie FRS FCS (8 February 1866–20 August 1916) was a British physiologist.

He was educated at King's College School, St John's College, Cambridge and graduated in medicine from King's College London.

He was made a Fellow of the Royal Society in 1904 and delivered the Croonian Lecture in 1911. He was also a Fellow of the Chemical Society and a Fellow of King's College London. He became Professor of Physiology at the University of Toronto in 1908.

References

1866 births
1916 deaths
People educated at King's College School, London
Alumni of St John's College, Cambridge
Alumni of King's College London
Fellows of King's College London
Fellows of the Royal Society
Fellows of the Chemical Society
Academic staff of the University of Toronto
British physiologists